Rubia tinctorum, the rose madder or common madder or dyer's madder, is a herbaceous perennial plant species belonging to the bedstraw and coffee family Rubiaceae.

Description

The common madder can grow up to 1.5 m in height. The evergreen leaves are approximately 5–10 cm long and 2–3 cm broad, produced in whorls of 4–7 starlike around the central stem. It climbs with tiny hooks at the leaves and stems. The flowers are small (3–5 mm across), with five pale yellow petals, in dense racemes, and appear from June to August, followed by small (4–6 mm diameter) red to black berries. The roots can be over a metre long, up to 12 mm thick and the source of red dyes known as rose madder and Turkey red. It prefers loamy soils (sand and clay soil) with a constant level of moisture. Madder is used as a food plant by the larvae of some Lepidoptera species including the hummingbird hawk moth.

Uses

It has been used since ancient times as a vegetable red dye for leather, wool, cotton and silk. For dye production, the roots are harvested after two years. The outer red layer gives the common variety of the dye, the inner yellow layer the refined variety. The dye is fixed to the cloth with help of a mordant, most commonly alum. Madder can be fermented for dyeing as well (Fleurs de garance). In France, the remains were used to produce a spirit.

The roots contain the acid ruberthyrin. By drying, fermenting, or a treatment with acids, this is changed to sugar, alizarin and purpurin, which were first isolated by the French chemist Pierre Jean Robiquet in 1826. Purpurin is normally not coloured, but is red when dissolved in alkaline solutions. Mixed with clay and treated with alum and ammonia, it gives a brilliant red colourant (madder lake).

The pulverised roots can be dissolved in sulfuric acid, which leaves a dye called garance (the French name for madder) after drying. Another method of increasing the yield consisted of dissolving the roots in sulfuric acid after they had been used for dyeing. This produces a dye called garanceux. By treating the pulverized roots with alcohol, colorine was produced. It contained 40–50 times the amount of alizarin of the roots.

The chemical name for the pigment is alizarin, of the anthraquinone-group, and was used to make the alizarine ink in 1855 by Professor Leonhardi of Dresden, Germany. In 1869, the German chemists Graebe and Liebermann synthesised artificial alizarin, which was produced industrially from 1871 onwards, effectively ending the cultivation of madder. In the 20th century, madder was only grown in some areas of France.

The plant's roots contain several polyphenolic compounds, such as 1,3-Dihydroxyanthraquinone (purpuroxanthin), 1,4-Dihydroxyanthraquinone (quinizarin), 1,2,4-Trihydroxyanthraquinone (purpurin) and 1,2-dihydroxyanthraquinone (alizarin). This last compound gives it its red colour to a textile dye known as Rose madder. It was also used as a colourant, especially for paint, that is referred to as madder lake. The substance was also derived from another species, Rubia cordifolia.

History
Early evidence of dyeing comes from India where a piece of cotton dyed with madder has been recovered from the archaeological site at Mohenjo-daro (3rd millennium BCE). In Sanskrit, this plant is known by the name Manjishtha. It was used by hermits to dye their clothes saffron.  Dioscorides and Pliny the Elder (De Re Natura) mention the plant (which the Romans called rubia passiva). In Viking Age levels of York, remains of both woad and madder have been excavated. The oldest European textiles dyed with madder come from the grave of the Merovingian queen Arnegundis in Saint-Denis near Paris (between 565 and 570 AD). In the "Capitulare de villis" of Charlemagne, madder is mentioned as "warentiam". The herbal of Hildegard of Bingen mentions the plant as well. The red coats of the British Redcoats were dyed with madder, after earlier being dyed with cochineal. Madder is mentioned in the talmud (e.g., tractate Sabbath 61b) where the madder plant is termed "puah" in Arameic and translated into old French by Rashi (loc cit).

Turkey red was a strong, very fast red dye for cotton obtained from madder root via a complicated multistep process involving "sumac and oak galls, calf's blood, sheep's dung, oil, soda, alum, and a solution of tin." Turkey red was developed in India and spread to Turkey.  Greek workers familiar with the methods of its production were brought to France in 1747, and Dutch and English spies soon discovered the secret.  A sanitized version of Turkey red was being produced in Manchester by 1784, and roller-printed dress cottons with a Turkey red ground were fashionable in England by the 1820s.

Folk medicine
According to Culpeper's herbal, the plant is "an herb of Mars" and "hath an opening quality, and afterwards to bind and strengthen". The root was recommended in the treatment of yellow jaundice, obstruction of the spleen, the melancholy humour, palsy, sciatica, and of bruises. The leaves were advised for women “that have not their courses” and for the treatment of freckles and other discolorations of the skin.

Risks
Madder root may cause birth defects and miscarriages in humans when taken internally.

References

External links

 "Rubia.—Madder", King's American Dispensatory, 1898.

Flora of Europe
Flora of Lebanon
Plant dyes
Plants described in 1753
tinctorum
Taxa named by Carl Linnaeus